Mary Kennedy is an Irish TV presenter.

Mary Kennedy may also refer to:

Media and entertainment
Máire Ní Chinnéide (1879–1967), also called Mary Kennedy, Irish scholar
Mary B. Kennedy (born 1947), American neuroscientist
Mary Ann Kennedy (Scottish singer) (born 1967/68), Scottish singer and radio presenter
Mary Ann Kennedy (American singer), country music artist
M. F. K. Fisher (1908–1992), née Kennedy, American food writer
Mary-Kathryn Kennedy, American TV producer
Mary Kerry Kennedy (born 1959), American human rights activist and writer
Mimi Kennedy (Mary Kennedy, born 1948), actress and author

Others
Mary Clare Kennedy, Abbess of the Poor Clares of Galway
Mary Olivia Kennedy (1880–1943), journalist and first woman staff reporter of The Times
Mary Kennedy, character in The Neglected Wife
Mary Richardson Kennedy (1959–2012), member of the Kennedy family
Mary Elizabeth Kennedy (1911–1991), American artist and quilter